Vela-class submarines of the Indian Navy were variants of the later Soviet s. The last of the class was decommissioned from the Indian Navy in December 2010.

 is planned to be preserved as a museum in Tamil Nadu, though the process has been plagued with issues and is currently on hold.

Ships of the class

References

External links
 THE SUBMARINE ARM
 Submarine Arm preamble

Submarine classes
 
India–Soviet Union relations